Neoclinus nudus is a species of chaenopsid blenny found in coral reefs around Okinawa Island, Japan, and Taiwan, in the northwest Pacific ocean.

References
 Stephens, J.S. Jr. and V.G. Springer, 1971 Neoclinus nudus, new scaleless clinid fish from Taiwan with a key to Neoclinus. Proceedings of the Biological Society of Washington v. 84 (no. 9): 65–72.

nudus
Fish described in 1971
Taxa named by Victor G. Springer